David S. Harkness (born May 29, 1965) is an American former professional tennis player.

A left-hander, Harkness played four years of collegiate tennis while attending Brigham Young University (BYU). He was named WAC Freshman of the Year in 1985 and was a two-time All-American during his time at BYU.

Harkness, who turned professional in 1989, had a best singles world ranking of 256 and featured in the qualifying draw for the 1990 Wimbledon Championships. He won an ATP Challenger doubles title in Jakarta in 1990 (with Mike Briggs).

In 2017 he was inducted into the Utah Tennis Hall of Fame.

ATP Challenger titles

Doubles: (1)

References

External links
 
 

1965 births
Living people
American male tennis players
BYU Cougars men's tennis players
Tennis people from Utah